This article lists the confirmed national football squads for the 2011 AFC Asian Cup tournament  held in Qatar between 7 January and 29 January 2011. Before announcing their final squad, several teams named a provisional squad of 23 to 30 players, but each country's final squad of 23 players had to be submitted by 28 December 2010. Replacement of injured players was permitted until 6 hours before the team's first Asian Cup game. Players marked (c) were named as captain for their national squad. Number of caps counts until the start of the tournament, including all pre-tournament friendlies.  Player's age is their age on the opening day of the tournament.

Group A

Qatar 
Head coach:  Bruno Metsu

Uzbekistan 
Head coach:  Vadim Abramov

Kuwait 
Head coach:  Goran Tufegdžić

China PR 
Head coach:  Gao Hongbo

Group B

Japan 
Head coach:  Alberto Zaccheroni

Jordan 
Head coach:  Adnan Hamad

Saudi Arabia 
Head coach:  José Peseiro (sacked after the first match, replaced by  Nasser Al-Johar)

Syria 
Head coach:  Valeriu Tiţa

Group C

South Korea 
Head coach:  Cho Kwang-rae

Australia 
Head coach:  Holger Osieck

Bahrain 
Head coach:  Salman Sharida

India 
Head coach:  Bob Houghton

Group D

North Korea 
Head coach:  Jo Tong-sop

United Arab Emirates 
Head coach:  Srečko Katanec

Iraq 
Head coach:  Wolfgang Sidka

Iran 
Head coach:  Afshin Ghotbi

Player representation 
Clubs represented by five or more players

By club nationality

† Including Jade North who played for Wellington Phoenix, a New Zealand club competing in the A-League.

By club Federation

† Including Jade North who played for Wellington Phoenix, a New Zealand club competing in the A-League. All other New Zealand clubs are members of the OFC.

By representatives of domestic league

† Including Jade North who played for Wellington Phoenix, a New Zealand club competing in the A-League.

References 

 "China squad". The-AFC.com. Asian Football Confederation. Retrieved 2010-12-30.
 "Kuwait squad". The-AFC.com. Asian Football Confederation. Retrieved 2011-1-7.
 "Qatar squad". The-AFC.com. Asian Football Confederation. Retrieved 2011-1-7.
 "Uzbekistan squad". The-AFC.com. Asian Football Confederation. Retrieved 2010-12-30.
 "Japan squad". ''The-AFC.com. Asian Football Confederation. Retrieved 2010-12-30.
 "Jordan squad". The-AFC.com. Asian Football Confederation. Retrieved 2010-12-30.
 "Saudi Arabia squad". The-AFC.com. Asian Football Confederation. Retrieved 2010-12-30.
 "Syria squad". The-AFC.com. Asian Football Confederation. Retrieved 2010-12-30.
 "Regulations"

 "Australia squad". The-AFC.com. Asian Football Confederation. Retrieved 2010-12-30.
 "Bahrain squad". The-AFC.com. Asian Football Confederation. Retrieved 2010-12-30.
 "India squad". ''The-AFC.com. Asian Football Confederation. Retrieved 2010-12-30.
 "Korea Republic squad". The-AFC.com. Asian Football Confederation. Retrieved 2010-12-30.
 "DPR Korea squad". The-AFC.com. Asian Football Confederation. Retrieved 2010-12-30.
 "Iran squad". ''The-AFC.com. Asian Football Confederation. Retrieved 2010-12-30.
 "Iraq squad". The-AFC.com'. Asian Football Confederation. Retrieved 2010-12-30.
 "United Arab Emirates squad". The-AFC.com'''. Asian Football Confederation. Retrieved 2010-12-30.

Squads
AFC Asian Cup squads